South Branch Verdigre Creek is a -long fourth-order tributary to Verdigre Creek in Knox County, Nebraska.  This stream along with East Branch Verdigre Creek forms Verdigre Creek.

Course
South Branch Verdigre Creek rises on the Elkhorn River divide about 3 miles southeast of Page, Nebraska and then flows generally northeast to join East Branch Verdigre Creek to form Verdigre Creek about 8 miles east-southeast of Venus, Nebraska.

Watershed
South Branch Verdigre Creek drains  of area, receives about 26.1 in/year of precipitation, has a wetness index of 513.35, and is about 3.29% forested.

See also

List of rivers of Nebraska

References

Rivers of Antelope County, Nebraska
Rivers of Knox County, Nebraska
Rivers of Nebraska